Suvo Rudište is the name of a mountain plateau and its peak at 1976 m, belonging to the Kopaonik mountain (and Kopaonik mountain range) in Serbia.

The locale of Suvo Rudište (a tourist settlement), in Kopaonik, is a center of the Kopaonik National Park. The area is a natural reservation, covering 50,63 hectares, located on the northeastern slopes of the Suvo Rudište Peak, on part of the slopes stretching from Pančić's Peak towards the source prong of Brzećka reka including the locale of Krčmar voda.

The area was studied by botanist Josif Pančić (1814–1888).

It was a site of operations in World War II.

References

Further reading

External links
 

Mountains of Serbia
Raška District
Rasina District
Mines in Serbia
Kopaonik